Pinecone & Pony is a children's animated streaming television series produced by DreamWorks Animation and First Generation Films for Apple TV+. The series is loosely based on the children's book The Princess and the Pony by Kate Beaton. The first season was released on April 8, 2022, and the second season was released on February 3, 2023.

Premise 
The series follows the adventures of Pinecone and her pony as they face trolls, giants, dragons and a dangerous rope bridge atop a valley.

Cast and characters
Maria Nash as Pinecone
Chase W. Dillon as Hawthorn
Rachel House as Gladys
Alicia Richardson as Queen Kimya
Andy Hull as Arlo/Whomp
Thom Allison as Greymoon
Viola Abley as Annabelle
Vienna Jackson as Oatcake
River Novin as Peregrine
Shiloh Obasi as Rhino
Beatrice Schneider as Fauna
Ser Anzoategui as Wren
Emma Hunter as Magpie
Scott Thompson as Thistle
Karen Robinson as Magnolia 
Michela Mohamud as Beetle
Johnathan Langdon as Rowan
Grace Lynn Kung as June
Julius Cho as Doraji
Samiyah Crowfoot as Celestia
John Michael Banovich as Nova

Episodes

Season 1 (2022)

Season 2 (2023)

Production
Cartoonist Kate Beaton published the webcomic Hark! A Vagrant from 2008 to 2018 with a variety of characters, one of which was a fat, farting pony. This pony later played a central role in Beaton's 2015 children's book The Princess and the Pony; about a warrior princess named Princess Pinecone who receives a pony as a birthday gift.

Beaton was approached several years later by First Generation Films, a production company out of Toronto, asking for the rights to the show to option it (in partnership with DreamWorks Animation) to different streaming services. The show was eventually picked up by Apple TV+ as the platform began to roll out children's programming.

Beaton is listed on the project as Executive Producer along with Christina Piovesan, Mackenzie Lush and showrunner Stephanie Kaliner. While Beaton worked on the show from her home in Mabou, Nova Scotia, animation was handled by Atomic Cartoons of Ottawa. The cast of included Maria Nash as the title character, Alicia Richardson, Andy Hull, Rachel House, Thom Allison, Chase W. Dillon and Viola Abley. Following the release of Season 1, Back Lot Music released a new song called "Warrior" written by Greg Alsop and performed by Tasha Peter.

References

External links 
 

2022 American television series debuts
2020s American children's television series
2020s American animated television series
2022 Canadian television series debuts
2020s Canadian children's television series
2020s Canadian animated television series
American children's animated adventure television series
American flash animated television series
Animated television series about children
Animated television series about horses
Apple TV+ children's programming
Apple TV+ original programming
Canadian children's animated adventure television series
Canadian flash animated television series
English-language television shows
Television series by DreamWorks Animation